Otluk is a village in the Üzümlü District, Erzincan Province, Turkey. The village had a population of 13 in 2021.

References 

Villages in Üzümlü District
Kurdish settlements in Erzincan Province